"Repetitive Regret" is a song written by Reed Nielsen and Mark Wright, and recorded by American country music artist Eddie Rabbitt.  It was released in March 1986 as the second single from the album Rabbitt Trax.  The song reached number 4 on the Billboard Hot Country Singles & Tracks chart.

Chart performance

References

1986 singles
1986 songs
Eddie Rabbitt songs
Songs written by Reed Nielsen
Songs written by Mark Wright (record producer)
Song recordings produced by Richard Landis
RCA Records singles